Ruza is the name of several inhabited localities in Moscow Oblast, Russia:

Urban localities
Ruza, Ruzsky District, Moscow Oblast, a town in Ruzsky District

Rural localities
Ruza, Volokolamsky District, Moscow Oblast, a village in Ostashevskoye Rural Settlement of Volokolamsky District